A combustion pipette is an apparatus for the reaction of liquids under a mild electric current and a supply of oxygen. In this experiment the test solution is a mixture of agar and oxalic acid in the presence of an electrolyte called cadmium chloride and an oxidant potassium permanganate. The voltage applied is 105VDC and a current of about 300mADC.

References

 Encyclopedia of Chemical Technology vol 6
 Encyclopedia of Organic Chemistry by Sananda Chattejee

Laboratory equipment